This is a list of countries by irrigated land area based on The World Factbook of the Central Intelligence Agency. The two countries with the largest irrigated land area are China and India, which make up 21.3% and 20.6% of worldwide irrigated land area respectively . Non-sovereign territories are not ranked and are shown in italics.

See also 

 Gezira Scheme
 Irrigation
 Irrigation district
 Irrigation environmental impacts
 Irrigation management
 Irrigation statistics
 Lift irrigation schemes
 Paddy field
 Qanat
 Surface irrigation
 Tidal irrigation

References

External links 
 World map of irrigated land as percentage of cultivated land(PDF) from Food and Agriculture Organization, UN, Accessed March 4, 2009

Lists of countries by economic indicator
Geography-related lists

Lists of countries by geography
 Irrigated
Countries By Irrigated Land Area